Emanuela Luknárová (born 7 March 2002 in Bratislava) is a Slovak canoeist. She competes both in polo and kayak slalom. She was a part of the winning C1 crew at the 2022 European Canoe Slalom Championships in Liptovský Mikuláš.

Achievements

References

Living people
2002 births
Slovak female canoeists
Sportspeople from Bratislava